Dansh is a 2005 Hindi Drama film directed by Kanika Verma and produced by Anish Ranjan. The film features Kay Kay Menon, Sonali Kulkarni and Aditya Srivastava in titular roles. The film is based on the armed struggle of the Mizoram National Front with Indian Army along with blood, torture and rape sequences. The film is a remake of the movie "Death and the Maiden".

Story

The actual story begins in 1986, when the MNF signs a truce agreement with the Indian government. The rebels are torn between their heads and their hearts. How can we make peace with the soldiers who raped our women, pillaged our land, some of them are asking. The leader Mathew (Kay Kay) is the voice of reason: we have to forget the past for the future, the people want peace, he urges, and prevails. Even as Mizoram celebrates, a chance meeting finds Mathew inviting a Mumbai-based Mizo doctor (Aditya Srivastava) over to his house. After a drinking bout pondering on war and peace, the doctor is in no state to drive home and Mathew asks him to stay over. Upstairs, Maria (Sonali Kulkarni), Mathew's wife and fellow rebel, has recognised the man downstairs as the doctor in the Indian Army camp who raped her repeatedly when she had been caught and interrogated. She wants revenge. But she never saw the army camp doctor. She was blindfolded all the time. So how is she sure this man is the same, a horror-struck Mathew demands of his wife when he finds she has bound the doctor to a chair and started torturing him. I remember his voice, I remember his smell, Maria says. I am innocent, your wife has gone mad because of the army torture, the doctor pleads. What follows is a night of self-discovery for Mathew, Maria and the doctor. And perhaps, a message for terrorists who believe the 'cause' justifies the means; as well as people who feel the gun is the only solution for dealing with aggrieved, angry people.

Cast
Kay Kay Menon as Matthew
Sonali Kulkarni as Maria
 Aditya Srivastava as Dr. John Sanga
Vijay Raj as Village Doctor

Music

The music of the film is composed by Fazal Qureshi and lyrics are penned by Nida Fazli.

References

External links

2000s Hindi-language films
2005 films
Non-Assamese-language films with Assamese connection
Indian remakes of American films
Indian drama films
2005 drama films
Hindi-language drama films